Perry Monnaie (born May 15, 1997) is a Seychellois football player. He is a striker playing for La Passe FC and the Seychelles national football team. He has represented Seychelles in the AFCON 2018.

International career

International goals
Scores and results list Seychelles' goal tally first.

References

External links 

 Perry Monnaie on EuroSport

1997 births
Living people
Seychellois footballers
La Passe FC players
Association football forwards
Seychelles international footballers